Follett High School or Follett School is a public high school located in the town of Follett, Texas, USA and classified as a 1A school by the UIL.  It is a part of the Follett Independent School District located in northeastern Lipscomb County.   In 2015, the school was rated "Met Standard" by the Texas Education Agency.

Athletics
The Follett Panthers compete in these sports - 

6-Man Football, Basketball, Track, Baseball & Softball

State Titles
Football  - 
1974(8M)^
Girls Basketball - 
1970(B), 2008(1A/D2)

^Eight man football was played for a few years in the 1970s.

State Finalist
Football  - 
1975(8M), 2008(6M/D1), 2012(6M/D2)

Theater
One Act Play 
2001(1A)

References

External links
Follett ISD website

Public high schools in Texas
Schools in Lipscomb County, Texas